The mayor of Los Angeles is head of the executive branch of the government of Los Angeles and the chief executive of Los Angeles. The office is officially nonpartisan, a change made in the 1909 charter; previously, both the elections and the office were partisan.

42 men and one woman have been mayor since 1850, when California became a state following the American conquest of California. Between 1781 and the conquest, Californios, or native-born residents of the Mexican territory, served as alcalde, equivalent to mayor.  The current Mayor is Karen Bass, who was elected in November 17, 2022 and took office on December 12, 2022.

History 
The office of Alcalde, the Mayor of El Pueblo de la Reina de los Ángeles, was established in 1781 and elected annually without the right to reelection for two years. In 1841, the office of alcalde was abolished, instead being replaced by two Jueces de Paz (Justice of the peace). In 1844, the office of alcalde was restored, but kept the two officials. When California was conquered and Los Angeles became under United States, the office name was changed to Mayor.

Powers 
Los Angeles has a council form of government, giving the mayor the position of chief executive of the city. The mayor appoints general managers and commissioners, removes officials from city posts, and proposes a yearly budget. Most of the mayor's appointments and proposals are subject to approval by the City Council. The mayor also has the power to veto or to approve certain City Council actions, though the City Council can override the Mayor's veto with a two-thirds vote.

The organization of the mayor's office changes with administration, but is almost always governed by a chief of staff, deputy chief of staff, director of communications, and several deputy mayors. Each mayor organizes their office into different offices, usually containing the Los Angeles Housing Team, Los Angeles Business Team, International Trade Office, Mayor's Volunteer Corps, and Office of Immigrant Affairs, among other divisions.

The mayor has an office in the Los Angeles City Hall and resides at the mayor's mansion, Getty House, located in Windsor Square. As of 2020, the mayor received a salary of $248,141.

Succession
In the case of an office vacancy, the city council has a choice to appoint a new mayor or to hold a special election. The replacement, if appointed, will serve until the next regularly scheduled primary for a city general election. If any portion remains on the term, a special election will be held to elect a candidate to serve the remainder of the term.

The mayor is subject to recall by registered voters if at least 15 percent of eligible voters sign a recall petition within 120 days of the first day of circulation. If the petition is successful, a special election is held asking whether the incumbent should be removed and who among a list of candidates should replace the incumbent. If the recall is successful, the replacement candidate with the majority of votes succeeds the ousted incumbent. If no replacement candidate receives a majority of the votes, a special runoff election is held between the top two candidates.

Elections 
The mayor is elected in citywide election and follow a two-round system. The first round of the election is called the primary election, with the candidate receiving a majority of the vote in the primary is elected outright. If no candidate receives a majority, the top two candidates advance to a runoff election, called the general election. The city charter allows for write-in candidates for the primary election, but not for the runoff in the general election. The mayor is elected to a four-year term, with a limit of two consecutive terms, and is officially nonpartisan by state law, although most mayoral candidates identify a party preference.

Elections for mayor were held in odd-numbered years from 1909 until 2013. In October 2014, the Los Angeles City Council recommended consolidating city elections with gubernatorial and presidential elections in even-numbered years in an effort to increase turnout. On March 3, 2015, voters passed a charter amendment to extend the term of the mayor elected in 2017 to five and a half years. From 2022 and onward, mayoral elections will be consolidated with the statewide gubernatorial elections held every four years.

The most recent election was held in November 2022. Politician Karen Bass defeated businessman Rick Caruso.

See also

 History of Los Angeles
 Timeline of Los Angeles
 Government of Los Angeles
Los Angeles City Council
President of the Los Angeles City Council

References

External links

Office of Mayor website 

 
Government of Los Angeles
Mayors
Los Angeles
Los Angeles-related lists
Politicians from Greater Los Angeles
1850 establishments in California